Pavan Kapoor (born 24 December 1966) is an Indian diplomat and current Indian Ambassador to Russia. He previously served as India's High Commissioner to Mozambique and the Kingdom of Swaziland from January 2014 to early 2016, Ambassador to Israel from March 2016 to September 2019, and Ambassador to the United Arab Emirates from October 2019 to November 2021.

Career
Pavan Kapoor joined the Indian Foreign Service in 1990. In his diplomatic career, he has served in different Indian Missions abroad, the Ministry of External Affairs, and the Prime Minister's Office in New Delhi. He also served as an international civil servant with the Commonwealth Secretariat in London.

Personal life
Pavan Kapoor is married to Aradhana Sharma, who is a freelance journalist.

See also
Vijay Gokhale
Dr. S Jaishankar
Navtej Sarna

References

External links
 India Ambassador, Official page at Embassy of India, Moscow

High Commissioners of India to Mozambique
Ambassadors of India to Israel
Ambassadors of India to Russia
1966 births
Living people